Jack Rowell OBE (born 1937) is an English rugby union coach and executive. He is the former coach of Bath and England.

Rugby career

Coaching
Between 1978 and 1994 Rowell coached Bath during their golden era, winning eight John Player/Pilkington Cups and five League Championships.

Rowell was the coach of the England rugby team from 1995 to 1997. He took over from Geoff Cooke, announcing that England would give up the forward-dominated, risk-free strategies that had won so many Five Nations Championship titles in the past, instead adopting a 'running rugby' style. Rowell's England won twenty-one of their twenty-nine matches, including the 1995 World Cup quarter-final against Australia. In percentage terms of games won Rowell is England's second most successful rugby union coach.

In 2002 he returned to Bath as director of rugby.

Administration
In 1998 Rowell became a non-executive director on the board of Bristol, when millionaire businessman Malcolm Pearce saved the club from extinction. In September 2000 he became Managing Director.

Business career
Rowell is Chairman of Celsis plc, Chairman of UK products Ltd which is quoted on AIM and Chairman of Turleigh Ltd, a private company.

He has acted as chairman of a number of companies in the public and private sectors, mainly in food. He was previously an executive director on the board of Dalgety plc with responsibility for the consumer foods division.

Honours
Rowell was awarded the OBE for services to the game of Rugby Union.

In 1994, he was awarded an Honorary Degree (Doctor of Laws) by the University of Bath.

References

External links 
Jack Rowell profile Bath Rugby

{

English rugby union coaches
Bath Rugby head coaches
Alumni of St Edmund Hall, Oxford
Officers of the Order of the British Empire
1937 births
Living people
England national rugby union team coaches
Sportspeople from Hartlepool